They Know may refer to:

"Dey Know" (Shawty Lo song), 2007
"Headlines" (Drake song), sometimes referred to as "They Know", 2011

See also
They Don't Know (disambiguation)